Halydaia is a genus of flies in the family Tachinidae.

Species
Halydaia aurea Egger, 1856
Halydaia luteicornis (Walker, 1861)
Halydaia mackerrasi Paramonov, 1960
Halydaia norrisi Paramonov, 1960
Halydaia rufiventris (Malloch, 1930)

References

Dexiinae
Tachinidae genera
Diptera of Europe
Diptera of Asia
Diptera of Australasia
Taxa named by Johann Egger